Breitscheid is a quarter of the city Ratingen in Germany.

References

Towns in North Rhine-Westphalia